NKD may refer to:

Naked cuticle, a conserved family of intracellular proteins encoded in most animal genomes.
NKD (retailer), a German clothing discount store chain headquartered in Bindlach, Germany.